Qaarsorsuaq Island (old spelling: Qaerssorsuaq) is an uninhabited island in Avannaata municipality in northwestern Greenland. At , it is one of the largest islands in the Upernavik Archipelago, located in its southern part. The name of the island means "a large rock surface" in the Greenlandic language.

Geography

Location within the archipelago 

In the north, the Torsuut strait separates it from Atilissuaq Island, and several skerries. In the northeast, small, low islands of Tapeq, Qeqertat, and Nunaa separate the island from the larger Aappilattoq Island, home to the Aappilattoq settlement. In the east and southeast, Qaarsorsuaq Island is separated from the large Nutaarmiut Island by the Akornat Strait.

Coastline 
The island has a complicated shoreline, with several small bay and inlet indentations. The largest inlet is the Saqqarsuaq Fjord in the south.

Promontories 

Due to the complicated shoreline the island has a number of promontories, some of which bear identical names, such as Qoornoq and Apparsuit. The names: rock surface and rock fall (or rock wall), respectively, refer to the landform shapes of the promontories, and are very common in the archipelago.

Mountains 
The island is mountainous throughout, with several distinct summits. Via a small isthmus in the north, the island is connected with an otherwise standalone mountain, the flooded peak of Umiasussuk, the trapezoid shape of which is the landmark of Upernavik town, visible from the Upernavik Airport and the entire eastern and northern coast of Upernavik Island.

Valleys 

There are two significant valleys on the island. Saqqarsuup Itillia (old spelling: Sarqarssûp itivdlia) dissects the eastern part of the island into two separate massifs, the southern topping at a  peak, and the northern topping at  peak, to the east of the Umiasussuk mountain. The valley holds a small lake of the same name.

The southwestern coast is home to several small lakes, most of which are in the north–south oriented Itillersuaq (old spelling: Itivdlerssuaq) valley, through which leads a walking trail. The name of the valley means "a crossing point between two fjords" in the Greenlandic language.

References 

Uninhabited islands of Greenland
Islands of the Upernavik Archipelago